The 2012 ECO summit was the twelfth Economic Cooperation Organization summit, held on 16 October 2012 in Baku, Azerbaijan.

Attending delegations
 President Hamid Karzai 
 President Ilham Aliyev 
 President Mahmoud Ahmadinejad 
President Nursultan Nazarbayev 
 President Almazbek Atambayev  
 President Asif Ali Zardari 
 President Emomali Rahmon 
 Prime Minister Recep Tayyip Erdoğan  
 President Gurbanguly Berdimuhamedow 
 President Islam Karimov

References

External links
12th Summit Declaration

21st-century diplomatic conferences
2012 in Azerbaijan
2012 in international relations
2012 conferences
Economic Cooperation Organization summits
2010s in Baku